Upward Sports is a non-profit 501(c)(3) organization with the mission of "promoting the discovery of Jesus through sports". Upward Sports partners with churches in the US and Canada to bring youth sports ministry in their local communities. Upwards Sports was founded in 1995 by Caz McCaslin.

Structure
There are over 2,800 Upward Sports programs across the US serving hundreds of thousands of young athletes playing recreational basketball, soccer, cheerleading, flag football, and volleyball. Upward Sports equips local churches that represent various evangelical denominations with training, playbooks, sports apparel, ministry resources, and online player registration systems to run their own leagues.

The main Upward complex is located in Spartanburg, South Carolina and is separated into three buildings. The corporate offices, the distribution/warehouse, and the star center, which is a sports complex containing six basketball courts, four grass fields, and two turf fields.

History

Timeline
1986 – Caz McCaslin developed a basketball program that incorporated athletic skills and Biblical values

1995 – Launched first nationwide season of Upward Sports; seven churches hosted Upward basketball leagues with several hundred players

2000 – Expanded to include soccer and basketball cheerleading

2003 – The 1,000th church hosted an Upward Sports League

2005 – Added flag football and flag football cheerleading. Launched first Upward Sports international league in Cape Town, South Africa

2006 – More than 400,000 children participated in Upward Sports for the first time. Launched the first Upward Sports League in Canada

2007 – International expansion continued as a league launched in Ukraine

2007 – Military scholarship instituted for children of military men and women deployed overseas

2008 – First South American league launched in Brazil

2009 – Approximately 2,600 churches worldwide host Upward Sports leagues with 520,000 children and 480,000 volunteers, coaches and referees in 46 states and four countries (Brazil, Canada, South Africa, Ukraine)

2015 - LeBron James endorses the organization via Instagram

2020 - Kevin Drake named Executive Director of Upward Sports

2021 - Expanded to include volleyball

See also
Athletes in Action

References

Further reading
 
 
 
 
 
 
 
 
 
  
 Savannah Morning News - At Upward Basketball and Cheerleading every child is a winner 
 Lancaster Eagle Gazette - Upward and onward: Christian-based sports program promotes positive reinforcement 
 Cabarrus News - Christian League Leads Kids Upward

External links
 

Christian sports organizations
Children's sport
Soccer governing bodies in the United States
Youth soccer in the United States
Sports organizations of the United States